The National Postdoctoral Association (NPA) is a nonprofit 501(c)3 educational organization in the United States that is dedicated to enhancing the quality of the postdoctoral experience for all participants. Since its founding in 2003, more than 160 institutions have adopted portions of the NPA's Recommendations for Postdoctoral Policies and Practices. Today, the NPA has 180 institutional members, whose research efforts are supported by 40,000 postdocs, and 2,000 individual members

Largely run by member volunteers, NPA activities are coordinated by three professional staff members located at NPA headquarters in Washington, DC. The NPA is supported by its members and charitable contributions from the Alfred P. Sloan Foundation and the American Association for the Advancement of Science.

History
The NPA was established with the goal of facilitating improvements for postdoctoral researchers in the United States. At the time of its founding, there was no national organization with the primary aim of improving the American postdoctoral experience. The NPA has worked collaboratively with research institutions, postdoctoral affairs offices (PDOs), postdoctoral associations (PDAs), professional organizations, and scientific funding agencies. The NPA has sought especially to encourage the creation of additional PDOs and PDAs.

Founding members 
A steering committee composed of postdoctoral representatives from across the country initiated the formation of the NPA. The committee coalesced in April 2002 during Science's NextWave Postdoc Network meeting held in Washington D.C. At this meeting, attendees expressed broad support for a national organization that would provide focus and affect positive change for postdocs. In January 2003, the NPA was officially formed.

The founding members of the NPA include:

Orfeu M. Buxton – University of Chicago, Chicago, Illinois
Karen Christopherson – Stanford Medical School, Stanford, California
Raymond Clark – University of California, La Jolla, California
Carol L. Manahan – Johns Hopkins School of Medicine, Baltimore, Maryland
Arti Patel – National Cancer Institute/NIH, Bethesda, Maryland
Avi Spier – The Scripps Research Institute, La Jolla, California
Claudina Aleman Stevenson – National Cancer Institute/NIH, Bethesda, Maryland

As of August 2022, the organization’s executive director is Thomas P. Kimbis.

Aims
The aim of the NPA is to advance the U.S. research enterprise by maximizing the effectiveness of the research community and enhancing the quality of the postdoctoral experience for all participants.

Organization
Largely run by member volunteers, NPA activities are coordinated by two professional staff members located at NPA headquarters in Washington, D.C. The NPA is supported by its members and grants from government agencies and private foundations.

Leadership 
The NPA is led by a 12-member Board of Directors that is elected by the dues-paying membership. Within this Board, the Executive Committee and Governance Committees provide direction for the operations of the association. The Board governs the Committees of the Membership and the Executive Director. The Advisory Council also reports to the Board and provides an additional resource for guidance and support to the Board and Executive Director. The staff report directly to the Executive Director.

The members of the Board of Directors are elected for a two-year term, and Board elections are held annually. Governance Committee Chairs serve one-year terms. The Board appoints Chairs and Vice Chairs for the Committees of the Membership and the Diversity and International Officers, usually after a call for candidates.

Membership 
There are three types of NPA membership: Affiliate Member, Sustaining Member, and Full Individual Member. Organizations can obtain a Sustaining Membership that serves as a conduit for complimentary affiliate membership to that organization’s individuals. Any individual may join the NPA under the full membership category.

Committees of the membership
These committees are run by volunteers and are open to anyone interested in improving the postdoctoral experience.

Advocacy Committee: 
Addresses advocacy and policy issues affecting the postdoctoral community. Activities of this committee include the promotion and implementation of NPA recommended policies and practices as described in the Agenda for Change, increasing diversity among postdoctoral researchers, and monitoring the interests of international postdocs training in the United States. Additionally, the Advocacy Committee monitors policy issues and helps to maintain relationships with federal agencies and national organizations.

Meetings Committee: 
Plans and coordinates NPA-sponsored meetings and seminars. The main tasks revolve around the Annual and Regional meetings, including development of agendas, logistical arrangements, marketing and fundraising activities, and conducting post-meeting evaluations

Outreach Committee: 
Conducts outreach activities to promote the mission of the NPA. Its main activities include development and implementation of an annual campaign to recruit and retain NPA members, and expansion of member benefits through partnerships with organizations, businesses, and institutions. This committee is working on cultivating relationships with news media, societies. and other groups interested in postdoctoral issues.

Resource Development Committee: 
Develops and maintains tools and resources for use by the postdoctoral community. Main activities of this committee include maintaining the NPA website, publication of The POSTDOCKet, the quarterly publication of the NPA, and creation and implementation of NPA-sponsored surveys

Diversity and international officers
The Diversity Officer provides leadership on diversity issues and brings together postdocs and their allies in order to develop new resources, track information, promote dialogue, and effect change for underrepresented groups. The International Officer serves as the public face of international postdoc issues for the NPA. The Officers work with the membership committees to ensure that the NPA addresses the needs of the communities they represent and are the primary resource and expert advisor to the NPA Board of Directors, the Staff, and committees.

Governance committees 
Governance committees are generally populated by the members of the Board of Directors, although members of the NPA Advisory Council may be invited to serve if their skill set matches the agenda of the Committee.
 Development
 Finance
 Oversight governance
 Personnel
 Strategic planning

Program activities
The NPA’s program activities are focused in three key areas:

Advocacy 
The association advocates for policy change within research institutions that host postdoctoral scholars. Since the association’s founding, more than 160 institutions have adopted portions of the NPA’s Recommended Practices. The NPA continues to work with the leadership of federal funding agencies, such as the National Institutes of Health (NIH) and the National Science Foundation (NSF), to develop new programs and policies for postdoctoral training, compensation, and benefits. The NPA values its partners in advocacy, including prominent national associations and organizations that represent the scientific, research, and higher education communities.

Community-building 
The NPA hosts annual and regional meetings to provide opportunities for the postdoctoral community to gather and share best practices. The association also maintains various listservs and a Web site to facilitate networking nationwide

Resource development 
The NPA continues to provide the tools and resources that postdocs and administrators need for success. Most NPA publications are available online, with selected resources for members only. These include: an International Postdoc Survival Guide, Toolkits for Postdoc Associations & Offices, an Institutional Policy Database, and a Career Development Clearinghouse.

Events

Annual meeting 
Ever since its birth, the NPA convenes once a year for a meeting that focuses on postdoc activities (e.g., career development, training standard, advocacy, etc.). The meeting locations alternate between the East coast and the West coast, and spans two-and-a-half days. The first day of the meeting includes on site registration, a poster session, sessions for new attendees and round table networking meetings about the structure and functioning of the PDA and PDOs, as well as opening reception. The second day includes many plenary sessions, and concurrent workshops that cover topics of interests for postdocs, as well as keynote speaker. The third day continues with some concurrent sessions, plenary, and the meeting concludes with a town-hall meeting for the NPA, where ideas for new topics are exchanged.

Over the years sessions have included: career development and immigration planning for postdocs, underrepresented minority in academia, science and policy, issues related to communicating with non-scientific audience, a transition from academia to industry workshop Myers-Briggs sessions, posters describing activities in various postdoc associations nationwide. Among the keynote speakers, Dr Francis Collins, Director of the National Institutes of Health (NIH), gave a speech at the 8th NPA meeting in Philadelphia March 12–14, 2010, for 283 attendants.

National Postdoc Appreciation Week 
Starting 2009, every year the NPA holds a celebration to highlight the contributions of postdocs. The event takes places on the third week of September. Institutions and universities around the US participate in that event through major networking activities, including happy hour, seminars, and more. Although postdoc training is considered a temporary position, postdocs are a vital part of the research body, and contribute a major portion of publications and grants. Therefore, the NPA decided to focus on the role postdocs play by celebrating an annual National Postdoc Appreciation Week. This event includes not only postdocs, but also graduate students and faculty members, friends and family.

September 24, 2009 marked the National Postdoctoral Association's first ever 'National Postdoc Appreciation Day'. 70 institutions across 27 states hosted celebrations, and there were events held in Canada and Australia. The Appreciation Day was organized to recognize the contribution that postdocs make to research every day across the country. Events were organized at institutions ranging from universities and research institutes, to the National Institutes of Health (NIH). Events ran the gamut from ice cream socials, to BBQs and Happy Hours. Many institutions also used the day as an opportunity to hold career seminars, mini research symposia and presentations about maximising the postdoctoral experience.

Recognition 
In an article published in Nature, Stacy L. Gelhaus, Chair of the NPA Board of Directors, wrote an opinion piece regarding the inequality of salaries between men and women scientists.
The role of the NPA in advocating for improvement of postdoc funding has been highlighted in an article in ASMBC.
The journey of a successful postdoc: Stacy L. Gelhaus tells Science what it takes for a bright career.
The NPA awards two postdoctoral entrepreneurs for excellency. Cathee Johnson Phillips, Executive Director of the NPA, explains the process and the event at https://web.archive.org/web/20100621084046/http://www.kauffman.org/two_postdoctural_entreprenerus_are_recognized_for_excellence.aspx.

References

External links
 NPA website
 NPA Facebook page
 NPA LinkedIn page
 NPA awardee
 NIH Director and Postdocs
 Postdoctoral Research
 JHMI celebrated the national postdoc appreciation day
 FASEB recognizes first national postdoc appreciation day 
 Stony Brook celebrates first national postdoc appreciation day
 Postdoctoral fellows seek to boost their visibility around the nation
 Canadian Institutions followed the NPA National Postdoc Appreciation Day
 Brigham and Women's Hospital celebrate the National Postdoc Appreciation Day
 The National Academies
 AAAS
 AAAS and postdocs
 NIH
 NRSA Stipened
 Postdoctoral Life
 The UK Research Staff Association
 http://history.nih.gov/research/downloads/stetten_fellow_handbook.pdf
 http://www.research.vcu.edu/vpr/postdoc/benefits.htm
 http://postdocs.stanford.edu/benefits/
 https://web.archive.org/web/20100619211044/http://funding.niaid.nih.gov/ncn/budget/stipendlevels.htm
 http://www.nature.com/nature/journal/v465/n7301/full/4651006a.html
 http://www.asbmb.org/uploadedFiles/ASBMBToday/Content/Archive/ASBMBToday-July-2009.pdf
 
 https://web.archive.org/web/20100621084046/http://www.kauffman.org/two_postdoctural_entreprenerus_are_recognized_for_excellence.aspx
 http://www.bioone.org/doi/pdf/10.1525/bio.2010.60.2.4

Organizations established in 2003
Education-related professional associations
Education trade unions
University organizations
Postdoctoral research